Nicholas Anderson (born April 26, 1995) is an American singer-songwriter, multi-instrumentalist, and record producer. He is best known as the frontman of the alternative rock band the Wrecks since its formation in 2015. He remains their primary producer and lyricist but has recently collaborated with a variety of artists on projects outside the scope of the Wrecks.

Early life
Anderson was born in Western New York to John Anderson, an editor for the Daily News and the Tyler Morning Telegraph, and Kasey Ross Riley, a school secretary. He grew up in rural Wellsville, the second oldest of five siblings. He learned to play the piano at eight years old and taught himself to play the guitar at fourteen. He cites his early experience in producing to experimenting in Garageband on the iMac at his father's workplace. In December 2012, he formed pop punk cover band Exit Plan with Tyler Cornell, Jesse McKee, and Jimmy Dixon. The band released a four-track CD and a non-album single.

Aside from music, Anderson was also proficient in baseball. Anderson pitched for a varsity team at Wellsville High School from 2011 until his graduation in 2013. After setting several regional records, he played for San Diego City College in California, pursuing a two-year major in digital audio technology alongside baseball. Around this time, Anderson was a successful contestant on gameshow Let's Make a Deal. While balancing his college career, seventeen-year-old Anderson continued performing at various San Diego music festivals with Exit Plan.

Career
Anderson met future bandmate Aaron Kelley on Facebook around 2010 when he was fourteen-years-old. Remaining friends through 2014, Kelley introduced Anderson to recording industry executive Richard Reines, of whom he was interning for at the time, and Anderson began writing and producing for the bands that Reines managed. In September 2014, Anderson and Kelley formed a pop-punk band, Coastbound, with three others – Kyle Hulett, Steven Groot, and Taylor Enzminger. The group released five-track EP Wasting Your Breath and a mildly successful cover of The Weeknd's "The Hills." Coastbound continued performing at local music festivals in California throughout 2015; however, in September 2015, Anderson and Kelley announced their intentions to place the band on a hiatus to pursue a "new music endeavor with an indie rock project." Sometime in October 2015, Anderson's new project released a song, "Get 'Em Ready," which features in Episode 5 of CBS's Limitless.

The Wrecks

In late 2015, Anderson and Kelley invited Billy Nally, Harrison Nussbaum, and Nick "Schmizz" Schmidt to join their new project. In regards to how he met his other band members, Anderson stated, "We weren't picked out... we all knew each other from other bands and projects. I was starting this band and I knew these guys were really talented and I asked them to join it and they all agreed to move to Los Angeles and do it with me."

The Wrecks had formally begun in Thousand Oaks, California, in mid-November 2015. Through a friend's housekeeping engagement, Anderson gained access to a professional home studio, albeit without the owner's permission, and the group self-recorded three tracks for an extended play in just three days, with roommate, sound engineer, and Coastbound collaborator Andrew D'Angelo serving as co-producer. On December 22, 2016, the line-up signed with Another Century Records. Soon after, their debut single "Favorite Liar" received significant airplay and charted in the top forty on alternative radio. The single obtained five million Spotify streams within a year of its release; as of December 2020, the track boasted over twenty-five million streams.

After their record deal with Another Century Records, the Wrecks attempted to professionally record their sophomore EP in Los Angeles; however, discontent with its sound, the band abandoned the project to start from scratch. Having depleted their budget, Anderson and his band members attempted to fund their endeavors by participating in medical studies and working minimum wage jobs. The band temporarily moved into Anderson's grandmother's home in rural Wellsville, New York to record their next EP. Panic Vertigo was released on February 16, 2018.

The Wrecks' debut album, Infinitely Ordinary, was released on May 1, 2020. On December 18, 2020, the Wrecks released their third EP, Static. Then, on June 10, 2022, they released their second full length album called Sonder. They are touring this album nationally in 2022, ending in November 2022 in Ventura county (home to the city of Thousand Oaks).

Other projects
In May 2018, Anderson performed an untitled song on Episode No. 39 of Beyond the Pine. On the podcast, he made it clear that it was written independently from the Wrecks. Sometime later, Anderson gave the song to country band The Roads Below, who are also managed by War Road Music. Their version was released in June 2020.

In August 2019, Hoodie Allen's song "You Should Let Me Know" was released, with lyrics, production, and vocals contributed by Anderson, and guitar supplied by fellow Wrecks guitarist Schmidt. On March 25, 2020, the band's frontman Anderson was featured alongside Hoodie on an MTV Instagram livestream during which he teased the Wrecks' upcoming album. During the same livestream, it was revealed that Anderson produced all of the song's on Hoodie's fifth album.

In August 2020, it was reported that Anderson was a producer and co-writer for the band Fox Royale.

On November 13, 2020, coinciding with Good Boy Daisy's debut single "Grey," Anderson announced his partnership with the band as their producer. In the following year, the Wrecks would feature on the Good Boy Daisy's single "Never Learn" and produce their third single "Summer Rain."

Personal life

Anderson often incorporates themes of depression and anxiety into his music, having dealt with them in high school. "Coming to terms with it is the most healthy thing you can do," he has said.

In 2013, Tyler Joseph and Josh Dun of Twenty One Pilots attended the concerts of Anderson's first band, Exit Plan. In 2016, Louis Tomlinson of One Direction viewed the Wrecks at the Silverlake Lounge.

Anderson has publicly endorsed Nerf, even recording an original song using their products. He also regularly commends Teddy Fresh on social media and actively wears their clothing in promotional imagery related to the Wrecks; however, he has never had a brand deal with the company.

In 2020, he was a guest speaker at the Los Angeles College of Music.

Anderson currently resides in Encino of San Fernando Valley with streamers Steven Suptic and Clayton "Cib" James of Sugar Pine 7 being former roommates.

Discography

Solo
 "Here (In Your Arms) x Robbers" mashup (2019)
 "Past Life" (with Scotty Sire and Toddy Smith of "The Vlog Squad") (2020)

Exit Plan
 A Love for Tomorrow (2012)
 "Slooth" (2012)

Coastbound
 Wasting Your Breath (2015)
 "The Hills" (The Weeknd cover) (2015)

The Wrecks

 We Are The Wrecks (EP) (2016)
 Panic Vertigo (EP) (2018)
 Infinitely Ordinary (2020)
 Static (EP) (2020)
 Sonder (2022)

Good Boy Daisy

With other artists

Videography

Music videos

The Wrecks

Other appearances

Filmography

Television

Web

References

People from Wellsville, New York
People from Thousand Oaks, California
Another Century Records artists
Record producers from New York (state)
People from Buffalo, New York
American male songwriters
Living people
1995 births